China participated in the eighth Winter Paralympics in Salt Lake City, United States. This was its Winter Paralympics debut.

Athletes
China entered one athlete in alpine skiing and three in cross-country skiing.

Medalists

See also
China at the 2002 Winter Olympics

References

External links
Salt Lake City 2002 Paralympic Games, International Paralympic Committee

China at the Winter Paralympics
2002
2002 in Chinese sport